Lifestyles of the Sick & Dangerous is the fourth studio album released by Blind Channel, released on July 8, 2022. The album was made without an external producer.

Reviews 
 Kaoszine : 5/5
 Sound : 4/5
 V2.fi : 4/5

Track listing 
 "Opinions" – 3:07
 "Dark Side" – 2:57
 "Don't Fix Me" – 2:53
 "Bad Idea" – 3:12
 "Alive or Only Burning" – 3:09
 "Balboa" – 3:12
 "National Heroes" – 1:31
 "We Are No Saints" – 3:10
 "Autopsy" – 3:01
 "Glory for the Greedy" – 3:29
 "Thank You for the Pain" – 5:35

References 

2022 albums
Nu metal albums
Albums by Finnish artists
Blind Channel albums